Nafa or NAFA may refer to:

Nāfa, Okinawan for Naha, the capital city of the Okinawa Prefecture in Japan
NAFA (disambiguation)
Nafa, the local term for a subdistrict in Israel
Nanyang Academy of Fine Arts (abbreviated as NAFA), secondary school located in Singapore

People with the given name
Nafa Urbach (born 1980), Indonesian soap opera actress and singer

People with the surname
Mohamed Nafa (1939–2021), Israeli Druze politician who served as a member of the Israeli Knesset
Said Nafa or Said Naffaa (born 1953), Israeli Arab politician and lawyer, member of the Israeli Knesset